Vestbanen A/S, also known as Varde-Nørre Nebel Jernbane (VNJ), is a Danish railway company. Formerly owned by Ribe County (until the Danish Municipal Reform of 2007), the company leased its trains and infrastructure to Arriva, which operates Vestbanen's railway line between Varde and Nørre Nebel since 2002. Established in 1903, the company was originally headquartered in Varde, but is now administered from the county's offices in Ribe. The company is wholly owned by the Region of Southern Denmark.

Stations 
List of stations on the current Vestbane from Varde to Nørre Nebel

See also
 Rail transport in Denmark

References

External links
 www.vestbanen.dk
 

Railway companies established in 1903
Railway companies of Denmark

nl:Varde-Nørre Nebel Jernbane